Himantopterus venatus is a moth in the family Himantopteridae. It was described by Strand in 1914. It is found on Java.

References

Moths described in 1914
Himantopteridae